Augusto Harold Álvarez García (b. Mérida, Yucatán, December 24, 1914 – d. Mexico City, November 29, 1995) was a Mexican Modernist architect.

Biography 

Álvarez was student of José Villagrán García. He taught at the Escuela Nacional de Arquitectura of the Universidad Nacional Autónoma de México (UNAM), where the computer laboratory is named after him. He was founder of the school of architecture at the  Universidad Iberoamericana, and was its first director.

His design works were influenced by the International style architecture of Le Corbusier and Mies van der Rohe.

He collaborated with notable Mexican Modernist architects including Juan Sordo Madaleno, Enrique Carral Icaza, and Salvador Ortega Flores.

Selected works
He participated in projects for:
Mexico City International Airport
Universidad Iberoamericana
Business and administration school of the UNAM
Bank of Valle de México
IBM in Mexico City
An Archbishop's residence
Escuela Bancaria y Comercial
Torre Latinoamericana
Torre Altus.

See also
Modernist architecture in Mexico

References 

 Graciela de Garay: Augusto H. Álvarez. Historia Oral de la Ciudad de México: Testimonios de sus arquitectos (1940–1990), Instituto de Investigaciones Dr. José María Luis Mora, Mexico, 1994,
 Lourdes Cruz González Franco: [ Augusto H. Álvarez. Vida y Obra], UNAM faculty of architecture, Mexico, 2004.

External links 
 
 Bilder der Werke von Augusto H. Álvarez at praella.com
 Augusto H. Álvarez at Arquitectura Moderna

Modernist architects from Mexico
International style architects
1914 births
1995 deaths
Artists from Yucatán (state)
Academic staff of the National Autonomous University of Mexico
Academic staff of Universidad Iberoamericana
People from Mérida, Yucatán
20th-century Mexican architects